Dennis C. Lewiston or Denis  Lewiston (May 22, 1934 – June 8, 2014) was a cinematographer and former camera operator with a career spanning the 1960s through the 1990s. He has worked mostly on American television movies.  He occasionally worked as a film director or screenwriter.

References

External links
 

1934 births
2014 deaths
British cinematographers
British male screenwriters